Ekaterina Yurevna Gubareva (born 5 July 1983) is the deputy head of the collaborationist Kherson Military-Civilian Administration in Russian-occupied Ukraine. 

She previously held the position of "Minister of Foreign Affairs" in Russian-occupied Donetsk for the Donetsk People's Republic, recognized as a terrorist organization in Ukraine. She is married to separatist leader Pavel Gubarev. After being reported missing by her husband, on 16 November 2022 Russian media reported that she had been detained by the Russian police in relation to a corruption case involving embezzlement of public funds and suspended from her current position.

Early life and education
Born on 5 July 1983 in Kakhovka, she has a degree in computer science from the Donetsk National Technical University.

Separatist activities

Donetsk People's Republic
On 1 March 2014, during the protests in the southeastern part of Ukraine, her husband Pavel Gubarev was chosen as "people's governor" of Donetsk oblast at a rally in Donetsk. On 6 March 2014, he was arrested and taken by the Security Service of Ukraine to Kyiv. Ekaterina Gubareva then lived with their children in Rostov-on-Don, Russia for some time.

In April 2014, the Donetsk People's Republic was proclaimed within the Donetsk region. Gubareva led its Ministry of Foreign Affairs.

Gubareva became the organizer of humanitarian convoys (food, medicine, childcare products) for the civilians and fighters of the Donetsk People's Republic. She said: "We don't carry weapons or fighters, and we don't know anything about that side of things."

The European Union has sanctioned Gubareva. She was banned from entering the European Union and her accounts in European banks were frozen.
According to EU officials:

In her capacity of so called "Minister of Foreign Affairs" she is responsible of defending the so called "Donetsk People's Republic", thus undermining the territorial integrity, sovereignty and independence of Ukraine.

In addition, her bank account is used to finance illegal armed separatist groups.

In taking on and acting in this capacity she has therefore supported actions and policies which undermine the territorial integrity, sovereignty and independence of Ukraine.

On 16 August 2014, the former vice president of Transnistria, Alexander Karaman, replaced Gubareva in the post of foreign minister of the DPR, for unspecified reasons. She became the Deputy Minister of Foreign Affairs.

After an assassination attempt on her husband, Pavel Gubarev, on 13 October 2014,
she temporarily led the New Russia Party. Pavel Gubarev formed the Free Donbas movement in 2014.

Elections were held in the Donetsk People's Republic after the assassination of Alexander Zakharchenko. In September 2018, Pavel Gubarev went to Moscow and obtained permission to be a candidate for the post of head of the Donetsk People's Republic. As a result of this, the Gubarevs are being put under pressure by supporters of rival candidate, Denis Pushilin.

Ekaterina Gubareva was set to head the Free Donbas party list for the "elections" of the People's Council of the Donetsk People's Republic of 11 November 2018.  But on 29 September 2018, she was arrested and held in custody by unknown people, and so was unable to attend the party convention that day, with the result that she was excluded from the party list. At the convention, the movement was taken over by supporters of Denis Pushilin.  After this incident she left for Rostov-on-Don.

Russian occupation of Kherson Oblast
On 16 June 2022, during the Russian invasion of Ukraine, Gubareva took office as Chief of Staff and Deputy Head of the Russian-occupation government called "Kherson Military-Civilian Administration" for Digitalization, Communications, Legal Regulation, and Domestic and Foreign Policy. In statements made of a planned referendum to join Russia, she claimed that the Russian Federation was repeating the history of Empress Catherine who developed the "wild fields" following the Russo-Turkish War of 1768–1774.

Gubareva was reported to have disappeared on 15 November 2022. On 16 November, Russian media reported that Gubareva had been detained by the Russian police in relation to a corruption case involving embezzlement of public funds.

Personal life
She is married to Pavel Gubarev and has two sons and a daughter.

Before the war in Donbas, she was the well-known local organizer of the Healthy lifestyle festivals. Also she was an amateur artist, and her works were exhibited in a Donetsk gallery.

References

External links

 Ekaterina Gubareva's Facebook page.
 Official website of the Ministry of Foreign Affairs of the DPR

1983 births
Living people
People from Kakhovka
Pro-Russian people of the 2014 pro-Russian unrest in Ukraine
People of the Donetsk People's Republic
Pro-Russian people of the war in Donbas
Russian individuals subject to European Union sanctions
Ukrainian collaborators with Russia
Specially Designated Nationals and Blocked Persons List